Type 1 diabetes (T1D), formerly known as juvenile diabetes, is an autoimmune disease that originates when cells that make insulin (beta cells) are destroyed by the immune system. Insulin is a hormone required for the cells to use blood sugar for energy and it helps regulate glucose levels in the bloodstream. Before treatment this results in high blood sugar levels in the body. The common symptoms of this elevated blood sugar are frequent urination, increased thirst, increased hunger, weight loss, and other serious complications. Additional symptoms may include blurry vision, tiredness, and slow wound healing. Symptoms typically develop over a short period of time, often a matter of weeks.

The cause of type 1 diabetes is unknown, but it is believed to involve a combination of genetic and environmental factors. The underlying mechanism involves an autoimmune destruction of the insulin-producing beta cells in the pancreas. Diabetes is diagnosed by testing the level of sugar or glycated hemoglobin (HbA1C) in the blood. Type 1 diabetes can be distinguished from type 2 by testing for the presence of autoantibodies.

There is no known way to prevent type 1 diabetes. Treatment with insulin is required for survival. Insulin therapy is usually given by injection just under the skin but can also be delivered by an insulin pump. A diabetic diet and exercise are important parts of management. If left untreated, diabetes can cause many complications. Complications of relatively rapid onset include diabetic ketoacidosis and nonketotic hyperosmolar coma. Long-term complications include heart disease, stroke, kidney failure, foot ulcers and damage to the eyes. Furthermore, since insulin lowers blood sugar levels, complications may arise from low blood sugar if more insulin is taken than necessary.

Type 1 diabetes makes up an estimated 5–10% of all diabetes cases. The number of people affected globally is unknown, although it is estimated that about 80,000 children develop the disease each year. Within the United States the number of people affected is estimated at one to three million. Rates of disease vary widely, with approximately one new case per 100,000 per year in East Asia and Latin America and around 30 new cases per 100,000 per year in Scandinavia and Kuwait. It typically begins in children and young adults.

Signs and symptoms

Type 1 diabetes begins suddenly, typically in childhood or adolescence. The major sign of type 1 diabetes is very high blood sugar, which typically manifests in children as a few days to weeks of polyuria (increased urination), polydipsia (increased thirst), and weight loss. Children may also experience increased appetite, blurred vision, bedwetting, recurrent skin infections, candidiasis of the perineum, irritability, and performance issues at school. Adults with type 1 diabetes tend to have more varied symptoms that come on over months rather than days to weeks.

Prolonged lack of insulin can also result in diabetic ketoacidosis, characterized by persistent fatigue, dry or flushed skin, abdominal pain, nausea or vomiting, confusion, trouble breathing, and a fruity breath odor. Blood and urine tests reveal unusually high glucose and ketones in the blood and urine. Untreated ketoacidosis can rapidly progress to loss of consciousness, coma, and death. The percentage of children whose type 1 diabetes begins with an episode of diabetic ketoacidosis varies widely by geography, as low as 15% in parts of Europe and North America, and as high as 80% in the developing world.

Cause 
Type 1 diabetes is caused by the destruction of β-cells – the only cells in the body that produce insulin – and the consequent progressive insulin deficiency. Without insulin, the body is unable to respond effectively to increases in blood sugar. Due to this, people with diabetes have persistent hyperglycemia. In 70–90% of cases, β-cells are destroyed by someone's own immune system, for reasons that are not entirely clear. The best-studied components of this autoimmune response are β-cell-targeted antibodies that begin to develop in the months or years before symptoms arise. Typically someone will first develop antibodies against insulin or the protein GAD65, followed eventually by antibodies against the proteins IA-2, IA-2β, and/or ZNT8. People with more of these antibodies, and who develop them earlier in life, are at higher risk for developing symptomatic type 1 diabetes. The trigger for the development of these antibodies remains unclear. A number of explanatory theories have been put forward, and the cause may involve genetic susceptibility, a diabetogenic trigger, and/or exposure to an antigen. The remaining 10–30% of type 1 diabetics have β-cell destruction but no sign of autoimmunity; this is called idiopathic type 1 diabetes and its cause is unknown.

Environmental
Various environmental risks have been studied in an attempt to understand what triggers β-cell autoimmunity. Many aspects of environment and life history are associated with slight increases in type 1 diabetes risk, however the connection between each risk and diabetes often remains unclear. Type 1 diabetes risk is slightly higher for children whose mothers are obese or older than 35, or for children born by caesarean section. Similarly, a child's weight gain in the first year of life, total weight, and BMI are associated with slightly increased type 1 diabetes risk. Some dietary habits have also been associated with type 1 diabetes risk, namely consumption of cow's milk and dietary sugar intake. Animal studies and some large human studies have found small associations between type 1 diabetes risk and intake of gluten or dietary fiber; however, other large human studies have found no such association. Many potential environmental triggers have been investigated in large human studies and found to be unassociated with type 1 diabetes risk including duration of breastfeeding, time of introduction of cow milk into the diet, vitamin D consumption, blood levels of active vitamin D, and maternal intake of omega-3 fatty acids.

A longstanding hypothesis for an environmental trigger is that some viral infection early in life contributes to type 1 diabetes development. Much of this work has focused on enteroviruses, with some studies finding slight associations with type 1 diabetes, and others finding none. Large human studies have searched for, but not yet found an association between type 1 diabetes and various other viral infections, including infections of the mother during pregnancy. Conversely, some have postulated that reduced exposure to pathogens in the developed world increases the risk of autoimmune diseases, often called the hygiene hypothesis. Various studies of hygiene-related factors – including household crowding, daycare attendance, population density, childhood vaccinations, antihelminth medication, and antibiotic usage during early life or pregnancy – show no association with type 1 diabetes.

Genetics
Type 1 diabetes is partially caused by genetics, and family members of type 1 diabetics have a higher risk of developing the disease themselves. In the general population, the risk of developing type 1 diabetes is around 1 in 250. For someone whose parent has type 1 diabetes, the risk rises to 1–9%. If a sibling has type 1 diabetes, the risk is 6–7%. If someone's identical twin has type 1 diabetes, they have a 30–70% risk of developing it themselves.

About half of the disease's heritability is due to variations in three HLA class II genes involved in antigen presentation: HLA-DRB1, HLA-DQA1, and HLA-DQB1. The variation patterns associated with increased risk of type 1 diabetes are called HLA-DR3 and HLA-DR4-HLA-DQ8, and are common in people of European descent. A pattern associated with reduced risk of type 1 diabetes is called HLA-DR15-HLA-DQ6. Large genome-wide association studies have identified dozens of other genes associated with type 1 diabetes risk, mostly genes involved in the immune system.

Chemicals and drugs 
Some medicines can reduce insulin production or damage β cells, resulting in disease that resembles type 1 diabetes. The antiviral drug didanosine triggers pancreas inflammation in 5 to 10% of those who take it, sometimes causing lasting β-cell damage. Similarly, up to 5% of those who take the anti-protozoal drug pentamidine experience β-cell destruction and diabetes. Several other drugs cause diabetes by reversibly reducing insulin secretion, namely statins (which may also damage β cells), the post-transplant immunosuppressants cyclosporin A and tacrolimus, the leukemia drug L-asparaginase, and the antibiotic gatifloxicin. Pyrinuron (Vacor), a rodenticide introduced in the United States in 1976, selectively destroys pancreatic beta cells, resulting in type 1 diabetes after accidental poisoning. Pyrinuron was withdrawn from the U.S. market in 1979. Cancer Immunotherapy Drugs have also destroyed pancreatic beta cells, such as Opdivo among others.

Diagnosis

Diabetes is typically diagnosed by a blood test showing unusually high blood sugar. The World Health Organization defines diabetes as blood sugar levels at or above 7.0 mmol/L (126 mg/dL) after fasting for at least eight hours, or a glucose level at or above 11.1 mmol/L (200 mg/dL) two hours after an oral glucose tolerance test. The American Diabetes Association additionally recommends a diagnosis of diabetes for anyone with symptoms of hyperglycemia and blood sugar at any time at or above 11.1 mmol/L, or glycated hemoglobin (hemoglobin A1C) levels at or above 48 mmol/mol.

Once a diagnosis of diabetes is established, type 1 diabetes is distinguished from other types by a blood test for the presence of autoantibodies that target various components of the beta cell. The most commonly available tests detect antibodies against glutamic acid decarboxylase, the beta cell cytoplasm, or insulin, each of which are targeted by antibodies in around 80% of type 1 diabetics. Some healthcare providers also have access to tests for antibodies targeting the beta cell proteins IA-2 and ZnT8; these antibodies are present in around 58% and 80% of type 1 diabetics respectively. Some also test for C-peptide, a byproduct of insulin synthesis. Very low C-peptide levels are suggestive of type 1 diabetes.

Management 

The mainstay of type 1 diabetes treatment is the regular injection of insulin to manage hyperglycemia. Injections of insulin – via subcutaneous injection using either a syringe or an insulin pump – are necessary multiple times per day, adjusting dosages to account for food intake, blood glucose levels and physical activity. The goal of treatment is to maintain blood sugar in a normal range – 80–130 mg/dL before a meal; <180 mg/dL after – as often as possible. To achieve this, people with diabetes often monitor their blood glucose levels at home. Around 83% of type 1 diabetics monitor their blood glucose by capillary blood testing – pricking the finger to draw a drop of blood, and determining blood glucose with a glucose meter. The American Diabetes Association recommends testing blood glucose around 6–10 times per day: before each meal, before exercise, at bedtime, occasionally after a meal, and any time someone feels the symptoms of hypoglycemia. Around 17% of people with type 1 diabetes use a continuous glucose monitor, a device with a sensor under the skin that constantly measures glucose levels and communicates those levels to an external device. Continuous glucose monitoring is associated with better blood sugar control than capillary blood testing alone; however, continuous glucose monitoring tends to be substantially more expensive. Healthcare providers can also monitor someone's hemoglobin A1C levels which reflect the average blood sugar over the last three months. The American Diabetes Association recommends a goal of keeping hemoglobin A1C levels under 7% for most adults and 7.5% for children.

The goal of insulin therapy is to mimic normal pancreatic insulin secretion: low levels of insulin constantly present to support basic metabolism, plus the two-phase secretion of additional insulin in response to high blood sugar – an initial spike in secreted insulin, then an extended phase with continued insulin secretion. This is accomplished by combining different insulin preparations that act with differing speeds and durations. The standard of care for type 1 diabetes is a bolus of rapid-acting insulin 10–15 minutes before each meal or snacks, and as-needed to correct hyperglycemia. In addition, constant low levels of insulin are achieved with one or two daily doses of long-acting insulin, or by steady infusion of low insulin levels by an insulin pump. The exact dose of insulin appropriate for each injection depends on the content of the meal/snack, and the individual person's sensitivity to insulin, and is therefore typically calculated by the individual with diabetes or a family member by hand or assistive device (calculator, chart, mobile app, etc.). People unable to manage these intensive insulin regimens are sometimes prescribed alternate plans relying on mixtures of rapid- or short-acting and intermediate-acting insulin, which are administered at fixed times along with meals of pre-planned times and carbohydrate composition.

A non-insulin medication approved by the U.S. Food and Drug Administration for treating type 1 diabetes is the amylin analog pramlintide, which replaces the beta-cell hormone amylin. Addition of pramlintide to mealtime insulin injections reduces the boost in blood sugar after a meal, improving blood sugar control.  Occasionally, metformin, GLP-1 receptor agonists, Dipeptidyl peptidase-4 inhibitors, or SGLT2 inhibitor are prescribed off-label to people with type 1 diabetes, although fewer than 5% of type 1 diabetics use these drugs.

Lifestyle
Besides insulin, the major way type 1 diabetics control their blood sugar is by learning how various foods impact their blood sugar levels. This is primarily done by tracking their intake of carbohydrates – the type of food with the greatest impact on blood sugar. In general, people with type 1 diabetes are advised to follow an individualized eating plan rather than a pre-decided one. There are camps for children to teach them how and when to use or monitor their insulin without parental help. As psychological stress may have a negative effect on diabetes, a number of measures have been recommended including: exercising, taking up a new hobby, or joining a charity, among others.

Regular exercise is important for maintaining general health, though the effect of exercise on blood sugar can be challenging to predict. Exogenous insulin can drive down blood sugar, leaving those with diabetes at risk of hypoglycemia during and immediately after exercise, then again seven to eleven hours after exercise (called the "lag effect"). Conversely, high-intensity exercise can result in a shortage of insulin, and consequent hyperglycemia. The risk of hypoglycemia can be managed by beginning exercise when blood sugar is relatively high (above 100 mg/dL), ingesting carbohydrates during or shortly after exercise, and reducing the amount of injected insulin within two hours of the planned exercise. Similarly, the risk of exercise-induced hyperglycemia can be managed by avoiding exercise when insulin levels are very low, when blood sugar is extremely high (above 350 mg/dL), or when one feels unwell.

Transplant 

In some cases, people can receive transplants of the pancreas or isolated islet cells to restore insulin production and alleviate diabetic symptoms. Transplantation of the whole pancreas is rare, due in part to the few available donor organs, and to the need for lifelong immunosuppressive therapy to prevent transplant rejection. The American Diabetes Association recommends pancreas transplant only in people who also require a kidney transplant, or who struggle to perform regular insulin therapy and experience repeated severe side effects of poor blood sugar control. Most pancreas transplants are done simultaneously with a kidney transplant, with both organs from the same donor. The transplanted pancreas continues to function for at least five years in around three quarters of recipients, allowing them to stop taking insulin.

Transplantations of islets alone have become increasingly common. Pancreatic islets are isolated from a donor pancreas, then injected into the recipient's portal vein from which they implant onto the recipient's liver. In nearly half of recipients, the islet transplant continues to work well enough that they still don't need exogenous insulin five years after transplantation. If a transplant fails, recipients can receive subsequent injections of islets from additional donors into the portal vein. Like with whole pancreas transplantation, islet transplantation requires lifelong immunosuppression and depends on the limited supply of donor organs; it is therefore similarly limited to people with severe poorly controlled diabetes and those who have had or are scheduled for a kidney transplant.

Pathogenesis
Type 1 diabetes is a result of the destruction of pancreatic beta cells, although what triggers that destruction remains unclear. People with type 1 diabetes tend to have more CD8+ T-cells and B-cells that specifically target islet antigens than those without type 1 diabetes, suggesting a role for the adaptive immune system in beta cell destruction. Type 1 diabetics also tend to have reduced regulatory T cell function, which may exacerbate autoimmunity. Destruction of beta cells results in inflammation of the islet of Langerhans, called insulitis. These inflamed islets tend to contain CD8+ T-cells and – to a lesser extent – CD4+ T cells. Abnormalities in the pancreas or the beta cells themselves may also contribute to beta-cell destruction. The pancreases of people with type 1 diabetes tend to be smaller, lighter, and have abnormal blood vessels, nerve innervations, and extracellular matrix organization. In addition, beta cells from people with type 1 diabetes sometimes overexpress HLA class I molecules (responsible for signaling to the immune system) and have increased endoplasmic reticulum stress and issues with synthesizing and folding new proteins, any of which could contribute to their demise.

The mechanism by which the beta cells actually die likely involves both necroptosis and apoptosis induced or exacerbated by CD8+ T-cells and macrophages. Necroptosis can be triggered by activated T cells – which secrete toxic granzymes and perforin – or indirectly as a result of reduced blood flow or the generation of reactive oxygen species. As some beta cells die, they may release cellular components that amplify the immune response, exacerbating inflammation and cell death. Pancreases from people with type 1 diabetes also have signs of beta cell apoptosis, linked to activation of the janus kinase and TYK2 pathways.

Partial ablation of beta-cell function is enough to cause diabetes; at diagnosis, people with type 1 diabetes often still have detectable beta-cell function. Once insulin therapy is started, many people experience a resurgence in beta-cell function, and can go some time with little-to-no insulin treatment – called the "honeymoon phase". This eventually fades as beta-cells continue to be destroyed, and insulin treatment is required again. Beta-cell destruction is not always complete, as 30–80% of type 1 diabetics produce small amounts of insulin years or decades after diagnosis.

Alpha cell dysfunction 
Onset of autoimmune diabetes is accompanied by impaired ability to regulate the hormone glucagon, which acts in antagonism with insulin to regulate blood sugar and metabolism. Progressive beta cell destruction leads to dysfunction in the neighboring alpha cells which secrete glucagon, exacerbating excursions away from euglycemia in both directions; overproduction of glucagon after meals causes sharper hyperglycemia, and failure to stimulate glucagon upon hypoglycemia prevents a glucagon-mediated rescue of glucose levels.

Hyperglucagonemia 
Onset of type 1 diabetes is followed by an increase in glucagon secretion after meals. Increases have been measured up to 37% during the first year of diagnosis, while c-peptide levels (indicative of islet-derived insulin), decline by up to 45%. Insulin production will continue to fall as the immune system destroys beta cells, and islet-derived insulin will continue to be replaced by therapeutic exogenous insulin. Simultaneously, there is measurable alpha cell hypertrophy and hyperplasia in the early stage of the disease, leading to expanded alpha cell mass. This, together with failing beta cell insulin secretion, begins to account for rising glucagon levels that contribute to hyperglycemia. Some researchers believe glucagon dysregulation to be the primary cause of early stage hyperglycemia. Leading hypotheses for the cause of postprandial hyperglucagonemia suggest that exogenous insulin therapy is inadequate to replace the lost intraislet signalling to alpha cells previously mediated by beta cell-derived pulsatile insulin secretion. Under this working hypothesis intensive insulin therapy has attempted to mimic natural insulin secretion profiles in exogenous insulin infusion therapies.

Hypoglycemic glucagon impairment 
Glucagon secretion is normally increased upon falling glucose levels, but normal glucagon response to hypoglycemia is blunted in type 1 diabetics. Beta cell glucose sensing and subsequent suppression of administered insulin secretion is absent, leading to islet hyperinsulinemia which inhibits glucagon release.

Autonomic inputs to alpha cells are much more important for glucagon stimulation in the moderate to severe ranges of hypoglycemia, yet the autonomic response is blunted in a number of ways.  Recurrent hypoglycemia leads to metabolic adjustments in the glucose sensing areas of the brain, shifting the threshold for counter regulatory activation of the sympathetic nervous system to lower glucose concentration. This is known as hypoglycemic unawareness. Subsequent hypoglycemia is met with impairment in sending of counter regulatory signals to the islets and adrenal cortex. This accounts for the lack of glucagon stimulation and epinephrine release that would normally stimulate and enhance glucose release and production from the liver, rescuing the diabetic from severe hypoglycemia, coma, and death.  Numerous hypotheses have been produced in the search for a cellular mechanism of hypoglycemic unawareness, and a consensus has yet to be reached. The major hypotheses are summarized in the following table:

In addition, autoimmune diabetes is characterized by a loss of islet specific sympathetic innervation. This loss constitutes an 80–90% reduction of islet sympathetic nerve endings, happens early in the progression of the disease, and is persistent though the life of the patient. It is linked to the autoimmune aspect of type 1 diabetics and fails to occur in type 2 diabetics. Early in the autoimmune event, the axon pruning is activated in islet sympathetic nerves. Increased BDNF and ROS that result from insulitis and beta cell death stimulate the p75 neurotrophin receptor (p75NTR), which acts to prune off axons. Axons are normally protected from pruning by activation of tropomyosin receptor kinase A (Trk A) receptors by NGF, which in islets is primarily produced by beta cells. Progressive autoimmune beta cell destruction, therefore, causes both the activation of pruning factors and the loss of protective factors to the islet sympathetic nerves. This unique form of neuropathy is a hallmark of type 1 diabetes, and plays a part in the loss of glucagon rescue of severe hypoglycemia.

Complications

The most pressing complication of type 1 diabetes are the always present risks of poor blood sugar control: severe hypoglycemia and diabetic ketoacidosis. Hypoglycemia – typically blood sugar below 70 mg/dL – triggers the release of epinephrine, and can cause people to feel shaky, anxious, or irritable. People with hypoglycemia may also experience hunger, nausea, sweats, chills, dizziness, and a fast heartbeat. Some feel lightheaded, sleepy, or weak. Severe hypoglycemia can develop rapidly, causing confusion, coordination problems, loss of consciousness, and seizure. On average, people with type 1 diabetes experience a hypoglycemia event that requires assistance of another 16–20 times in 100 person-years, and an event leading to unconsciousness or seizure 2–8 times per 100 person-years. The American Diabetes Association recommends treating hypoglycemia by the "15-15 rule": eat 15 grams of carbohydrates, then wait 15 minutes before checking blood sugar; repeat until blood sugar is at least 70 mg/dL. Severe hypoglycemia that impairs someone's ability to eat is typically treated with injectable glucagon, which triggers glucose release from the liver into the bloodstream. People with repeated bouts of hypoglycemia can develop hypoglycemia unawareness, where the blood sugar threshold at which they experience symptoms of hypoglycemia decreases, increasing their risk of severe hypoglycemic events. Rates of severe hypoglycemia have generally declined due to the advent of rapid-acting and long-acting insulin products in the 1990s and early 2000s; however, acute hypoglycemic still causes 4–10% of type 1 diabetes-related deaths.

The other persistent risk is diabetic ketoacidosis – a state where lack of insulin results in cells burning fat rather than sugar, producing toxic ketones as a byproduct. Ketoacidosis symptoms can develop rapidly, with frequent urination, excessive thirst, nausea, vomiting, and severe abdominal pain all common. More severe ketoacidosis can result in labored breathing, and loss of consciousness due to cerebral edema. People with type 1 diabetes experience diabetic ketoacidosis 1–5 times per 100 person-years, the majority of which result in hospitalization. 13–19% of type 1 diabetes-related deaths are caused by ketoacidosis, making ketoacidosis the leading cause of death in people with type 1 diabetes less than 58 years old.

Long-term complications

In addition to the acute complications of diabetes, long-term hyperglycemia results in damage to the small blood vessels throughout the body. This damage tends to manifest particularly in the eyes, nerves, and kidneys causing diabetic retinopathy, diabetic neuropathy, and diabetic nephropathy respectively. In the eyes, prolonged high blood sugar causes the blood vessels in the retina to become fragile.

People with type 1 diabetes also have increased risk of cardiovascular disease, which is estimated to shorten the life of the average type 1 diabetic by 8–13 years. Cardiovascular disease as well as neuropathy may have an autoimmune basis, as well. Women with type 1 DM have a 40% higher risk of death as compared to men with type 1 DM.

About 12 percent of people with type 1 diabetes have clinical depression. About 6 percent of people with type 1 diabetes also have celiac disease, but in most cases there are no digestive symptoms or are mistakenly attributed to poor control of diabetes, gastroparesis or diabetic neuropathy. In most cases, celiac disease is diagnosed after onset of type 1 diabetes. The association of celiac disease with type 1 diabetes increases the risk of complications, such as retinopathy and mortality. This association can be explained by shared genetic factors, and inflammation or nutritional deficiencies caused by untreated celiac disease, even if type 1 diabetes is diagnosed first.

Urinary tract infection 
People with diabetes show an increased rate of urinary tract infection. The reason is bladder dysfunction is more common in people with diabetes than people without diabetes due to diabetes nephropathy. When present, nephropathy can cause a decrease in bladder sensation, which in turn, can cause increased residual urine, a risk factor for urinary tract infections.

Sexual dysfunction 
Sexual dysfunction in people with diabetes is often a result of physical factors such as nerve damage and poor circulation, and psychological factors such as stress and/or depression caused by the demands of the disease. The most common sexual issues in males with diabetes are problems with erections and ejaculation: "With diabetes, blood vessels supplying the penis's erectile tissue can get hard and narrow, preventing the adequate blood supply needed for a firm erection. The nerve damage caused by poor blood glucose control can also cause ejaculate to go into the bladder instead of through the penis during ejaculation, called retrograde ejaculation. When this happens, semen leaves the body in the urine." Another cause of erectile dysfunction is reactive oxygen species created as a result of the disease. Antioxidants can be used to help combat this. Sexual problems are common in women who have diabetes, including reduced sensation in the genitals, dryness, difficulty/inability to orgasm, pain during sex, and decreased libido. Diabetes sometimes decreases estrogen levels in females, which can affect vaginal lubrication. Less is known about the correlation between diabetes and sexual dysfunction in females than in males.

Oral contraceptive pills can cause blood sugar imbalances in women who have diabetes. Dosage changes can help address that, at the risk of side effects and complications.

Women with type 1 diabetes show a higher than normal rate of polycystic ovarian syndrome (PCOS). The reason may be that the ovaries are exposed to high insulin concentrations since women with type 1 diabetes can have frequent hyperglycemia.

Autoimmune disorders
People with type 1 diabetes are at an increased risk for developing several autoimmune disorders, particularly thyroid problems – around 20% of people with type 1 diabetes have hypothyroidism or hyperthyroidism, typically caused by Hashimoto thyroiditis or Graves' disease respectiveley. Celiac disease affects 2–8% of people with type 1 diabetes, and is more common in those who were younger at diabetes diagnosis, and in white people. Type 1 diabetics are also at increased risk of rheumatoid arthritis, lupus, autoimmune gastritis, pernicious anemia, vitiligo, and Addison's disease. Conversely, complex autoimmune syndromes caused by mutations in the immunity-related genes AIRE (causing autoimmune polyglandular syndrome), FoxP3 (causing IPEX syndrome), or STAT3 include type 1 diabetes in their effects.

Prevention
There is no way to prevent type 1 diabetes; however, the development of diabetes symptoms can be delayed in some people who are at high risk of developing the disease. In 2022 the FDA approved an intravenous injection of teplizumab to delay the progression of type 1 diabetes in those older than eight who have already developed diabetes-related autoantibodies and problems with blood sugar control. In that population, the anti-CD3 monoclonal antibody teplizumab can delay the development of type 1 diabetes symptoms by around two years.

In addition to anti-CD3 antibodies, several other immunosuppressive agents have been trialled with the aim of preventing beta cell destruction. Large trials of cyclosporine treatment suggested that cyclosporine could improve insulin secretion in those recently diagnosed with type 1 diabetes; however, people who stopped taking cyclosporine rapidly stopped making insulin, and cyclosporine's kidney toxicity and increased risk of cancer prevented people from using it long-term. Several other immunosuppressive agents – prednisone, azathioprine, anti-thymocyte globulin, mycophenolate, and antibodies against CD20 and IL2 receptor α – have been the subject of research, but none have provided lasting protection from development of type 1 diabetes. There have also been clinical trials attempting to induce immune tolerance by vaccination with insulin, GAD65, and various short peptides targeted by immune cells during type 1 diabetes; none have yet delayed or prevented development of disease.

Several trials have attempted dietary interventions with the hope of reducing the autoimmunity that leads to type 1 diabetes. Trials that withheld cow's milk or gave infants formula free of bovine insulin decreased the development of β-cell-targeted antibodies, but did not prevent the development of type 1 diabetes. Similarly, trials that gave high-risk individuals injected insulin, oral insulin, or nicotinamide did not prevent diabetes development.

Epidemiology 
Type 1 diabetes makes up an estimated 10–15% of all diabetes cases  or 11–22 million cases worldwide. Symptoms can begin at any age, but onset is most common in children, with diagnoses slightly more common in 5 to 7 year olds, and much more common around the age of puberty.  In contrast to most autoimmune diseases, type 1 diabetes is slightly more common in males than in females.

In 2006, type 1 diabetes affected 440,000 children under 14 years of age and was the primary cause of diabetes in those less than 15 years of age.

Rates vary widely by country and region. Incidence is highest in Scandinavia, at 30–60 new cases per 100,000 children per year, intermediate in the U.S. and Southern Europe at 10–20 cases per 100,000 per year, and lowest in China, much of Asia, and South America at 1–3 cases per 100,000 per year.

In the United States, type 1 and 2 diabetes affected about 208,000 youths under the age of 20 in 2015. Over 18,000 youths are diagnosed with Type 1 diabetes every year. Every year about 234,051 Americans die due to diabetes (type I or II) or diabetes-related complications, with 69,071 having it as the primary cause of death.

In Australia, about one million people have been diagnosed with diabetes and of this figure 130,000 people have been diagnosed with type 1 diabetes. Australia ranks 6th-highest in the world with children under 14 years of age. Between 2000 and 2013, 31,895 new cases were established, with 2,323 in 2013, a rate of 10–13 cases per 100,00 people each year. Aboriginals and Torres Strait Islander people are less affected.

Since the 1950s, the incidence of type 1 diabetes has been gradually increasing across the world by an average 3–4% per year. The increase is more pronounced in countries that began with a lower incidence of type 1 diabetes.

History

The connection between diabetes and pancreatic damage was first described by the German pathologist Martin Schmidt, who in a 1902 paper noted inflammation around the pancreatic islet of a child who had died of diabetes. The connection between this inflammation and diabetes onset was further developed through the 1920s by Shields Warren, and the term "insulitis" was coined by Hanns von Meyenburg in 1940 to describe the phenomenon.

Type 1 diabetes was described as an autoimmune disease in the 1970s, based on observations that autoantibodies against islets were discovered in diabetics with other autoimmune deficiencies. It was also shown in the 1980s that immunosuppressive therapies could slow disease progression, further supporting the idea that type 1 diabetes is an autoimmune disorder. The name juvenile diabetes was used earlier as it often first is diagnosed in childhood.

Society and culture

Type 1 and 2 diabetes was estimated to cause $10.5 billion in annual medical costs ($875 per month per diabetic) and an additional $4.4 billion in indirect costs ($366 per month per person with diabetes) in the U.S. In the United States $245 billion every year is attributed to diabetes. Individuals diagnosed with diabetes have 2.3 times the health care costs as individuals who do not have diabetes. One in ten health care dollars are spent on individuals with type 1 and 2 diabetes.

Research
Funding for research into type 1 diabetes originates from government, industry (e.g., pharmaceutical companies), and charitable organizations. Government funding in the United States is distributed via the National Institutes of Health, and in the UK via the National Institute for Health and Care Research or the Medical Research Council. The Juvenile Diabetes Research Foundation (JDRF), founded by parents of children with type 1 diabetes, is the world's largest provider of charity-based funding for type 1 diabetes research. Other charities include the American Diabetes Association, Diabetes UK, Diabetes Research and Wellness Foundation, Diabetes Australia, the Canadian Diabetes Association.

Organ replacement

Pluripotent stem cells can be used to generate beta cells but previously these cells did not function as well as normal beta cells. In 2014 more mature beta cells were produced which released insulin in response to blood sugar when transplanted into mice. Before these techniques can be used in humans more evidence of safety and effectiveness is needed.

There has also been substantial effort to develop a fully automated insulin delivery system or "artificial pancreas" that could sense glucose levels and inject appropriate insulin without conscious input from the user. Current "hybrid closed-loop systems" use a continuous glucose monitor to sense blood sugar levels, and a subcutaneous insulin pump to deliver insulin; however, due to the delay between insulin injection and its action, current systems require the user to initiate insulin before taking meals. Several improvements to these systems are currently undergoing clinical trials in humans, including a dual-hormone system that injects glucagon in addition to insulin, and an implantable device that injects insulin intraperitoneally where it can be absorbed more quickly.

Disease models 
Various animal models of disease are used to understand the pathogenesis and etiology of type 1 diabetes. Currently available models of T1D can be divided into spontaneously autoimmune, chemically induced, virus induced and genetically induced.

The nonobese diabetic (NOD) mouse is the most widely studied model of type 1 diabetes. It is an inbred strain that spontaneously develops type 1 diabetes in 30–100% of female mice depending on housing conditions. Diabetes in NOD mice is caused by several genes, primarily MHC genes involved in antigen presentation. Like diabetic humans, NOD mice develop islet autoantibodies and inflammation in the islet, followed by reduced insulin production and hyperglycemia. Some features of human diabetes are exaggerated in NOD mice, namely the mice have more severe islet inflammation than humans, and have a much more pronounced sex bias, with females developing diabetes far more frequently than males. In NOD mice the onset of insulitis occurs at 3–4 weeks of age. The islets of Langerhans are infiltrated by CD4+, CD8+ T lymphocytes, NK cells, B lymphocytes, dendritic cells, macrophages and neutrophils, similar to the disease process in humans. In addition to sex, breeding conditions, gut microbiome composition or diet also influence the onset of T1D.

The BioBreeding Diabetes-Prone (BB) rat is another widely used spontaneous experimental model for T1D. The onset of diabetes occurs, in up to 90% of individuals (regardless of sex) at 8–16 weeks of age. During insulitis, the pancreatic islets are infiltrated by T lymphocytes, B lymphocytes, macrophages, and NK cells, with the difference from the human course of insulitis being that CD4 + T lymphocytes are markedly reduced and CD8 + T lymphocytes are almost absent. The aforementioned lymphopenia is the major drawback of this model. The disease is characterized by hyperglycemia, hypoinsulinemia, weight loss, ketonuria, and the need for insulin therapy for survival. BB Rats are used to study the genetic aspects of T1D and are also used for interventional studies and diabetic nephropathy studies.

LEW-1AR1 / -iddm rats are derived from congenital Lewis rats and represent a rarer spontaneous model for T1D. These rats develop diabetes at about 8–9 weeks of age with no sex differences unlike NOD mice. In LEW mice, diabetes presents with hyperglycemia, glycosuria, ketonuria, and polyuria. The advantage of the model is the progression of the prediabetic phase, which is very similar to human disease, with infiltration of islet by immune cells about a week before hyperglycemia is observed. This model is suitable for intervention studies or for the search for predictive biomarkers. It is also possible to observe individual phases of pancreatic infiltration by immune cells. The advantage of congenic LEW mice is also the good viability after the manifestation of T1D (compared to NOD mice and BB rats).

Chemically induced 
The chemical compounds aloxan and streptozotocin (STZ) are commonly used to induce diabetes and destroy β-cells in mouse/rat animal models. In both cases, it is a cytotoxic analog of glucose that passes GLUT2 transport and accumulates in β-cells, causing their destruction. The chemically induced destruction of β-cells leads to decreased insulin production, hyperglycemia and weight loss in the experimental animal. The animal models prepared in this way are suitable for research into blood sugar-lowering drugs and therapies (e.g. for testing new insulin preparations). They are also the most commonly used genetically induced T1D model is the so-called AKITA mouse (originally C57BL/6NSIc mouse). The development of diabetes in AKITA mice is caused by a spontaneous point mutation in the Ins2 gene, which is responsible for the correct composition of insulin in the endoplasmic reticulum. Decreased insulin production is then associated with hyperglycemia, polydipsia and polyuria. If severe diabetes develops within 3–4 weeks, AKITA mice survive no longer than 12 weeks without treatment intervention. The description of the etiology of the disease shows that, unlike spontaneous models, the early stages of the disease are not accompanied by insulitis. AKITA mice are used to test drugs targeting endoplasmic reticulum stress reduction, to test islet transplants, and to study diabetes-related complications such as nephropathy, sympathetic autonomic neuropathy, and vascular disease. for testing transplantation therapies. Their advantage is mainly the low cost, the disadvantage is the cytotoxicity of the chemical compounds.

Genetically induced

Virally induced 
Viral infections play a role in the development of a number of autoimmune diseases, including human type 1 diabetes. However, the mechanisms by which viruses are involved in the induction of type 1 DM are not fully understood. Virus-induced models are used to study the etiology and pathogenesis of the disease, in particular the mechanisms by which environmental factors contribute to or protect against the occurrence of type 1 DM. Among the most commonly used are Coxsackie virus, lymphocytic choriomeningitis virus, encephalomyocarditis virus, and Kilham rat virus. Examples of virus-induced animals include NOD mice infected with coxsackie B4 that developed type 1 DM within two weeks.

References

Works cited

External links 
 National Institute of Diabetes and Digestive and Kidney Diseases (NIDDK) – Diabetes in America Textbook (PDFs)
 IDF Diabetes Atlas
 Type 1 Diabetes  at the American Diabetes Association
 ADA's Standards of Medical Care in Diabetes 2019

Autoimmune diseases
Diabetes

de:Diabetes mellitus#Diabetes Typ 1